KWIN (97.7 FM) and KWNN (98.3 FM) are a pair of commercial radio stations serving the Stockton and Modesto sections of California's Central Valley. They simulcast a Rhythmic CHR radio format and are owned by Cumulus Media.  KWIN is licensed to Lodi and KWNN is licensed to Turlock.  The studios and offices are in Stockton.  The transmitter for KWIN is off California State Route 99 at Cora Post Road in Lodi.  The transmitter for KWNN is off Geer Road in Hughson.

On air DJs include The Morning Block Party with Lucas, Middays with Lani Q, Afternoons with Jiggy, Nights with Tino Cochino, Danny B. & The Bomb Squad, Late Nights with Q and Overnights with Late Night Slow Jams R Dub and Jeff Bayani.

History
KTUR (later KCEY), signed on in 1949. In 1977, when an FM station was added, a new building went up. K-MIX 98 was automated adult contemporary with DJs recording their shows to give the impression of live broadcasts. In 1995, KMIX-FM became KWNN, simulcasting Rhythmic CHR KWIN.

References

External links 
Official Website

WIN
Mass media in Stockton, California
Modesto, California
Mass media in San Joaquin County, California
Mass media in Stanislaus County, California
Cumulus Media radio stations
Radio stations established in 1959
Mainstream urban radio stations in the United States
1959 establishments in California